Rooney is a 1958 British comedy film directed by George Pollock and starring John Gregson, Muriel Pavlow and Barry Fitzgerald.  It was based on the 1957 novel of the same name by Catherine Cookson.

Plot
The film depicts the life of James Ignatius Rooney, a Gaelic sportsman at the weekends, and a Dublin rubbish collector during the week.

Cast
 John Gregson as James Ignatius Rooney
 Muriel Pavlow as Maire Hogan
 Barry Fitzgerald as Grandfather
 June Thorburn as Doreen O'Flynn
 Noel Purcell as Tim Hennessy
 Marie Kean as Mrs. O'Flynn
 Liam Redmond as Mr. Doolan
 Jack MacGowran as  Joe O'Connor
 Eddie Byrne as Mickey Hart
 Philip O'Flynn as Paddy Ryan
 Harold Goldblatt as Police Inspector
 Pauline Delaney as Mrs. Wall
 Godfrey Quigley as Tom Reilly
 Irene Browne as Mrs. Manning ffrench
 Joan Phillips as Sheila O'Flynn

Production
Clive Donner said he was offered the job of directing the film after having made his feature febut with The Secret Place but he turned it down.

Critical reception
Bosley Crowther in The New York Times gave the film a mixed review though he added that, "we must say, John Gregson goes at the title role of the happy young bachelor dustman with a lively good nature and comic will"; while Tony Sloman in the Radio Times gave the piece three out of five stars, calling it "really quite charming"; and Allmovie found the film "Stronger on characterisation than plot," noting that "The film is at its best when the camera roams around the misty streets of Dublin, and at its worst when it pauses for sentiment."

Box office
Kinematograph Weekly listed it as being "in the money" at the British box office in 1958.

References

External links

1958 films
1958 comedy films
British comedy films
Films shot at Pinewood Studios
Films directed by George Pollock
Gaelic games films
Films with screenplays by Patrick Kirwan
Films based on British novels
1950s English-language films
1950s British films